The 2008–09 Chattanooga Mocs men's basketball team represented the University of Tennessee at Chattanooga in the 2008–09 NCAA Division I men's basketball season. The Mocs, led by head coach John Shulman, played their home games at the McKenzie Arena in Chattanooga, Tennessee, as members of the Southern Conference. The Mocs won a share of the SoCon North Division title, and won the 2009 SoCon tournament, earning an automatic bid to the NCAA tournament as the 16th seed in the West region. Chattanooga was beaten by top seed Connecticut in the first round, 103–47.

Roster 

Source

Schedule and results

|-
!colspan=12 style=|Regular season

|-
!colspan=12 style=| Southern Conference tournament

|-
!colspan=12 style=| NCAA tournament

Source

References

Chattanooga Mocs men's basketball seasons
Chattanooga
Chattanooga
Chattanooga Mocs men's basketball
Chattanooga Mocs men's basketball